The Store may refer to:

 The Store (Bluffton, South Carolina), United States, a historic building
 The Store (novel), a 1932 novel by Thomas Sigismund Stribling
 The Store (TV channel), a British shopping TV channel
 "The Store", a song from the soundtrack of Danganronpa Another Episode: Ultra Despair Girls

See also 
 Store (disambiguation)